100% Ginuwine is the second studio album from American R&B recording artist Ginuwine. It was released on March 16, 1999, on 550 Music and distributed through Epic Records. The album peaked at number 5 on the U.S. Billboard 200 and reached the second spot on the R&B Albums chart. The album was certified Gold in June 1999 and double Platinum by August 2000. It featured the hit singles "Same Ol' G", "What's So Different?", "So Anxious", and "None of Ur Friends Business".

Track listing

Samples
 "Little Man's Bangin Lude" contains a sample from the "MacGyver Theme" as composed by Randy Edelman
 "What's So Different?" contains a sample from "Valleri" as recorded by The Monkees
 "Do You Remember" contains a sample from Queen's "Flash's Theme"

Personnel
Credits taken from Allmusic.

A&R – Michael Caplan
Arranging – Giovanni Christian Morant
Art direction – Julian, Kiku
Assistant engineering – Alan Armitage, Soloman Jackson, Todd Wachsmuth
Composing – Johntá Austin, Ted Bishop, Timbaland
Conducting – Giovanni Christian Morant
Design – Julian, Kiku
Drumming – Jonathan "Mookie" Morant
Engineering – Dylan Dresdow, Kevin Hicks, Tommie Hicks, Jr., Senator Jimmy D, Joe Smith
Executive production – Ginuwine, Barry Hankerson, Harry Hankerson, Jomo Hankerson
Fender rhodes – Shaun Fisher
Flute – Obie Morant
Grooming – Linda Mason

Guitar – Jimmy Douglass, Dave Foreman, Jonathan "Mookie" Morant, Bill Pettaway
Guitar (bass) – Jonathan "Mookie" Morant, Dante Nolen
Keyboards – Jonathan "Mookie" Morant
Mastering – Chris Gehringer
Mixing – Jimmy Douglass, Timbaland
Performer(s) – Aaliyah, Elsie Muniz
Photography – Michael Benabib, Daniela Federici
Production – Ted Bishop, Ginuwine, Jonathan "Mookie" Morant, Timbaland
Sax (soprano) – Obie Morant
Strings – Craig Brockman, Norma Huff, Doug Pritchard, Jennie Rudberg
Stylist – Tameka Foster
Vocals – Aaliyah, Dave Foreman, Ginuwine, Elsie Muniz, Static, Louise C. West
Vocals (background) – Aaliyah, Ginuwine, Jonathan "Mookie" Morant, Static, Louise C. West

Charts

Weekly charts

Year-end charts

Certifications

References

External links
 
 100% Ginuwine at Discogs

1999 albums
Albums produced by Timbaland
Epic Records albums
Ginuwine albums
550 Music albums
Albums produced by Barry Hankerson